Violant is a given name, of Greek origin meaning violet. The form of the name in Greek is Iolanthe. Violant is the given name of:

Violant of Aragon (1236-1301), Queen consort of Castile and León
Violant of Bar (c. 1365-1431), Queen of Aragon
Violant of Hungary (c. 1216–1253), Queen consort of Aragon
Violant Cervera (born 1969), Catalan politician

Catalan feminine given names